Cristóbal Colón is an underground metro station on the Line 4 of the Santiago Metro, in Santiago, Chile. This station is named for Cristóbal Colón Avenue, which in turn was named after Christopher Columbus. The station was opened on 30 November 2005 as part of the inaugural section of the line between Tobalaba and Grecia.

References

Santiago Metro stations
Santiago Metro Line 4